Amin Shouman (born 14 December 1954) is an Egyptian basketball player. He competed in the men's tournament at the 1984 Summer Olympics.

References

1954 births
Living people
Egyptian men's basketball players
Olympic basketball players of Egypt
Basketball players at the 1984 Summer Olympics
Place of birth missing (living people)